The Indianapolis Olympians were a founding National Basketball Association (NBA) team based in Indianapolis. They were founded in 1949 and folded in 1953. Their home arena was Butler Fieldhouse on the campus of Butler University--now known as Hinkle Fieldhouse.

Franchise history
The Olympians were founded in 1949 to replace the Indianapolis Jets. The Olympians were led by University of Kentucky alumni Alex Groza and Ralph Beard, both of whom were key contributors on the gold medal winning 1948 US Olympic basketball team. Olympic team members Wallace Jones and Cliff Barker (both also Kentucky alumni) also played on the team. An Olympic alternate and UK grad, Joe Holland, played forward for the Indianapolis team through the 1952 season.

After the 1951 season, Groza and Beard were suspended from the NBA for life by commissioner Maurice Podoloff when the players admitted point shaving during their college careers. The Olympians finished with a 28–43 record in 1953, and folded after that season.  The Olympians compiled a 132–137 record in four seasons in the NBA. 

Indianapolis would not have an NBA team until 1976 when the Indiana Pacers were one of the four teams admitted from the ABA in the ABA–NBA merger.

The Olympians still hold the distinction of being the winning team in the longest game in NBA history—they were the 75–73 victors in a six-overtime game against the Rochester Royals in a game played on January 6, 1951.

Seasons

Notable players

Basketball Hall of Famers
None

Others
Ralph Beard
Alex Groza
Wallace Jones
Paul Walther
Kleggie Hermsen

Notes

References

External links
Indianapolis Olympians – all-time records and statistics
Olympians complete history NBA Hoops Online

 
Basketball teams established in 1949
Basketball teams disestablished in 1953
1949 establishments in Indiana
Defunct National Basketball Association teams
1953 disestablishments in Indiana